Busby Marou is the debut studio album by Australian blues and roots band Busby Marou. The album was originally self-released in August 2010 and was re-released on Warner Music Australia's indie imprint, Footstomp Records in June 2011 with a deluxe edition being released in March 2012.

In December 2010, in an interview with Deadly Vibe Magazine, Thomas Busby said "Most of our songs were written about home, or memories or places that we love and it's all really laidback, folky pop sort of tunes. We asked our producer if we could go back home to Yeppoon to record it because it was a bit difficult living out of a motel room for a couple of weeks recording. So we went back home and it was the best move, it was so relaxed, we were there for a couple of weeks, we already had the songs nutted out so we were just laying tracks down, laying the vocals down, and Jeremy with the guitar and bass work – so great process and great fun, and we got to stay at home as well and catch up with family while we were there."

The album peaked at number 24 on the ARIA Charts and was certified gold in 2014. The album was supported by a national tour across June and July 2011.

Background and release
In 2007, Thomas Busby and Jeremy Marou met and formed the band Busby Marou. The duo released their debut extended play later in 2007. In 2009, Busby Marou was one of five successful applicants for 'Breakthrough' – A Federal Government initiative supporting emerging indigenous contemporary musicians. The award assisted in the production of the band's debut album which was released in August 2010.

Reception
Lauren from Sounds of Oz said "This is really is back to basics music, without frills or gimmicks... It uses elements we know but don't hear enough of these days; simple but beautiful harmonies, the driving force of an acoustic guitar, and honest lyrics that paint moving stories." concluding with "Busby Marou's self-titled album is quite simply one of the best recordings I've heard all year."

Track listing

Charts

Certifications

Release history

References

2010 debut albums
Busby Marou albums